The Christian Democratic People's Party of Switzerland (CVP), also called the Christian Democratic Party (PDC), Democratic People's Party (PPD) and Swiss Christian Democratic Party, PCD), was a Christian-democratic political party in Switzerland. On 1 January 2021, it merged with the Conservative Democratic Party of Switzerland (BDP/PBD) to form The Centre, which now operates at the federal level. The Christian Democratic People's Party will continue to exist at the cantonal level as individual local and regional parties determine their status.

Its 28 parliamentary seats in the National Council and 13 parliamentary seats in the Council of States were transferred to the new party, as was its sole executive seat on the Federal Council, held by Viola Amherd.

The party was founded as the Catholic Conservative Party in 1912. It peaked in the 1950s, having three members of the Federal Council (1954–1958) before agreeing to the magic formula. It adopted its current name in 1970. From 1979 to 2003, the party's vote declined, mostly in the favour of the Swiss People's Party (SVP/UDC); the party was reduced to one Federal Councillor at the 2003 Federal Council election.

The party sat in the centre to centre-right of the political spectrum, advocating Christian democracy, the social market economy and moderate social conservatism. The party was strongest in Catholic rural areas, particularly Central Switzerland and Valais.

History

In 1912 the Catholic-Conservative Party of Switzerland was founded. From 1919 on, the party occupied two out of the seven seats in the cabinet. Aided by the political climate of the postwar period, the party experienced its peak in the 1950s: It was represented by the biggest parliamentary delegation in the Federal Council, and from 1954 to 1958 the party occupied three out of seven seats in the cabinet. Nonetheless, the party had to relinquish the third seat in favor of the 'magic formula', which was introduced to the cabinet in 1959. In 1957 it changed its name to the Conservative-Christian-Social People's Party and to its current name in 1970. In the ensuing decades, the Catholic voter base dissolved somewhat. The reduction of the voter base, in addition to less cohesion among politicians in the party, led to six successive losses in federal elections after 1980.

The party lost its support over a number of years. Beginning in the 1990s, conservative voters from former strongholds of the CVP switched to vote for the right-wing populist Swiss People's Party. From the 1995 election to the 2019 election, the CVP's vote share decreased from 16.8% to 11.4%.  After the 2003 election, Ruth Metzler of the CVP, was replaced by Christoph Blocher of the Swiss People's Party on the Federal Council, leaving the CVP with only one seat in the country's executive.

CVP President Gerhard Pfister and BDP President Martin Landolt, the leader of the Conservative Democratic Party, had ongoing discussions about a merger throughout 2020. In 2020, Pfister announced that the national CVP would undergo a change in branding with a new name and logo as part of a merger with the BDP. The merger was ratified by a vote of the entire party in November 2020. Cantonal parties were not required to adopt the new name if they do not wish to do so. Pfister estimated that a new center-right party could obtain up to 20% of the vote in future elections.

Platform
In its party platform, the CVP described itself as a centrist party. The CVP fostered a social market economy in which a balance is struck between economic liberalism and social justice. The expansion of the party in the Protestant-dominated cantons, in which the CVP uphold rather centrist policies, stands in contrast to the traditional role of the CVP as the leading party in rather Catholic-dominated cantons of central Switzerland and the cantons of Valais. There, the electorate was mostly socially conservative.

The CVP had three main policies in the political centre:

The CVP uphold the social market economy. It supports exporting industries and more spending on education, research and development. It also aims at combating the black market and tax evasion. In order to increase efficiency and incentives, the CVP calls for the reduction and streamlining of bureaucratic procedures and government agencies, low taxation for family enterprises and those who offer vocational education and internships. The CVP calls for equal wages and job opportunities for both men and women.
The CVP called for flexible working times, childcare and affordable housing.
The CVP aimed at ensuring social security. The CVP calls for reforms of the social security system, by raising taxes on demerit goods (e.g. tobacco taxes) to generate more revenues for the pension funds. The retirement age of 65 should also be upheld. The public health care system should be streamlined by a reduction of waiting times of medical procedures in order to ensure equitable services. The CVP also promotes workfare as the primary means to combat unemployment.

Popular support

Following continuing losses in the federal parliamentary elections until 2003, in December 2003, the party lost one of its two seats in the four-party coalition government, the Swiss Federal Council, to the Swiss People's Party. The CVP holds roughly 12% of the popular vote.

After the national election in late 2003, it held 28 seats (out of 200) in the Swiss National Council (first chamber of the Swiss parliament); 15 (out of 46) in the Council of States (second chamber, and the largest party in this chamber) and 1 out of 7 seats in the Swiss Federal Council (executive body).

In 2005, it held 20.7% of the seats in the Swiss Cantonal governments and 16.7% in the Swiss Cantonal parliaments (index "BADAC", weighted with the population and number of seats).
At the last legislative national elections, 22 October 2007, the party won 14.6% of the popular vote and 31 out of 200 seats in the National Council lower house. This was a gain of 3 seats, ending the long-term decline of the party and it was the only one of the four largest parties besides the Swiss People's Party to gain votes and seats.

In the Federal Assembly, the CVP formerly sat in a bloc in the Christian Democrats/EPP/glp Group, along with the Evangelical People's Party and Green Liberal Party.

Election results

National Council

Party strength over time 

1.A "*" indicates that the party was not on the ballot in this canton.
2.Part of the Canton of Bern until 1979.

Presidents 

 1986–1992 Eva Segmüller, St. Gallen
 1992–1994 Carlo Schmid-Sutter, Appenzell Innerrhoden
 1994–1997 Anton Cottier, Fribourg
 1997–2001 Adalbert Durrer, Obwalden
 2001–2004 Philipp Stähelin, Thurgau
 2004–2006 Doris Leuthard, Aargau
 2006–2016 Christophe Darbellay, Valais
 2016–2020 Gerhard Pfister, Zug

Secretaries-General
 1988–1992 Iwan Rickenbacher
 1992–1997 Raymond Loretan
 1997–2001 Hilmar Gernet
 2001–2008 Reto Nause
 2009–2012 Tim Frey
 2012–2018 Béatrice Wertli
 2018–2020 Gianna Luzio

Notes and references

Further reading

External links
 Official website
Christian Democratic People`s Party of Switzerland in History of Social Security in Switzerland

 
Catholic political parties
Christian democratic parties in Europe
Social conservative parties
Political parties established in 1912
Political parties disestablished in 2020
1912 establishments in Switzerland
2020 disestablishments in Switzerland
Centrist parties in Switzerland
Conservative parties in Switzerland